Dubrovka is a rural locality (a village) in Yurlinskoye Rural Settlement, Yurlinsky District, Perm Krai, Russia. The population was 190 as of 2010. There are 8 streets.

Geography 
Dubrovka is located 19 km southwest of Yurla (the district's administrative centre) by road. Vaskova is the nearest rural locality.

References 

Rural localities in Yurlinsky District